Gabriela Sedláková (born 2 March 1968) is a former Czechoslovak track and field athlete who competed in the 800 metres. She was the silver medallist in that event at the 1987 IAAF World Indoor Championships. Earlier she had been European junior champion and World junior runner-up.

Sedláková represented Czechoslovakia at the 1987 World Championships in Athletics and 1986 European Athletics Championships. She was twice a finalist at the European Athletics Indoor Championships. Her 800 m bests of 1:58.37 minutes outdoors and 2:01.85 minutes indoors remain the Slovak records for the distance. She was a seven-time Czechoslovak national champion.

Career
Born in Topoľčany (now in Slovakia), she emerged as a teenager at the 1985 European Athletics Junior Championships, where she shared in the 800 m title with Maria Pintea – the pair ended the race in a dead heat of 2:03.22 minutes. A second international medal followed at the 1986 World Junior Championships in Athletics the year after, where she ran a new best of 2:01.49 minutes to secure the silver medal behind Kenya's Selina Chirchir. She made her senior debut at the 1986 European Athletics Championships and ran a best of 2:00.61 minutes, but failed to make the final.

Still in the junior ranks in the 1987 season, she established herself at senior level. She won her first national title in the 800 m at the Czechoslovak Indoor Athletics Championships. This gained her selection for the 1987 European Athletics Indoor Championships and she made her first senior final, coming fourth and being beaten to a medal by Soviet runner Lyubov Kiryukhina. She also made the 800 m final at the World Indoor Championships held shortly after and a new indoor personal best of 2:01.85 minutes was a European junior record. It was also enough for a silver medal behind Christine Wachtel of East Germany. She was the first Czechoslovak woman to win a medal at the competition – only Ivana Kubešová joined her in that feat before the country's dissolution. Sedláková's European junior record lasted almost twenty-seven years before being improved by Iceland's Aníta Hinriksdóttir in 2014.

Going into the 1987 outdoor season, Sedláková won her first outdoor title at the Czechoslovak Athletics Championships. Her winning time of 2:00.42 minutes was another new best and the third-fastest ever winning time at the competition (only Jozefína Čerchlanová and Jarmila Kratochvílová had run faster). One week before the 1987 World Championships in Athletics she raised herself as a possible contender with another best at the Internationales Stadionfest meet in West Berlin, running 1:58.37 minutes. This proved to be her lifetime best and ultimately ranked her 15th globally on time that year. At the championships in Rome she narrowly missed the final, coming fourth in her semi-final.

She made only one further appearance in major international competition, running at the 1988 European Athletics Indoor Championships, at which she placed sixth. Her nation career continued to be successful, as she defended her indoor/outdoor Czechoslovak double in 1988, then won outdoors in 1989 and 1991. However, she never again reached her peak times. Her final national honour was a win in 1992 at the Czechoslovak Indoor Championships.

Following her retirement, her records were incorporated into the Slovak national record books and she remains the national record holder indoors and outdoors for the 800 m.

Personal bests
400 metres – 53.60 min (1986)
800 metres – 1:58.37 min (1987)
1500 metres – 4:15.18 min (1989)
400 metres indoor – 55.28 min (1986)
800 metres indoor – 2:01.85 min (1987)

National titles
Czechoslovak Athletics Championships
800 m: 1987, 1988, 1989, 1991
Czechoslovak Indoor Athletics Championships
800 m: 1987, 1988, 1992

International competitions

References

External links

Living people
1968 births
Sportspeople from Topoľčany
Czechoslovak female middle-distance runners
Slovak female middle-distance runners
World Athletics Championships athletes for Czechoslovakia
World Athletics Indoor Championships medalists